Return to List of towns in the Republic of Ireland

Alphabetical list of towns, together with their population as recorded by the Census of 2002. Villages with fewer than 100 people are not listed.

A

B

C

D

E

F

G

H

I

J

K

L

M

N

O

P

Q

R

S

T

U

V

W

Y

 
Towns